Wonder Lake is a village in McHenry County, Illinois, United States. It is a commuter village in the Chicago metropolitan area. The population was 3,973 at the 2020 census. However including surrounding unincorporated subdivisions, the population is estimated at 10,000.

Geography
Wonder Lake is located at  (42.38427, -88.367814).

Demographics

As of the census of 2000, there were 1,345 people, 445 households, and 367 families residing in the village. The racial makeup of the village was 97.17% White, 0.37% Black or African American, 0.07% Native American, 0.30% Asian, 1.12% from other races, and 0.97% from two or more races. Hispanic or Latino people of any race were 4.46% of the population.

There were 445 households, out of which 45.2% had children under the age of 18 living with them, 69.4% were married couples living together, 9.0% had a female householder with no husband present, and 17.5% were non-families. 12.8% of all households were made up of individuals, and 3.8% had someone living alone who was 65 years of age or older. The average household size was 3.02 and the average family size was 3.32.

In the village, the population was spread out, with 31.9% under the age of 18, 7.3% from 18 to 24, 33.5% from 25 to 44, 20.6% from 45 to 64, and 6.8% who were 65 years of age or older. The median age was 34 years. For every 100 females, there were 105.7 males. For every 100 females age 18 and over, there were 99.6 males.

The median income for a household in the village was $59,712, and the median income for a family was $62,404. Males had a median income of $49,792 versus $27,500 for females. The per capita income for the village was $21,428. About 2.6% of families and 2.7% of the population were below the poverty line, including 3.3% of those under age 18 and 3.1% of those age 65 or over.

Schools
Harrison School District 36 serves kindergarten through 8th grade students living on the east Ssde of the village of Wonder Lake. The school mascot is the Hurricane. The school property is located directly east of Harrison-Benwell County Park. The east side of Wonder Lake is served by McHenry Community High School District 156, while the west side is served by Woodstock Community Unit School District 200.

Lake and village

The name Wonder Lake now refers to both the lake itself and a village incorporated in 1974 from one of the west side unincorporated blocks of homes, Sunrise Ridge, called "subdivisions", that surround most of the lake. Initially named the Village of Sunrise Ridge, the name was changed to the Village of Wonder Lake a few years later. The population of the combined village and all surrounding subdivisions has published population estimates currently over 10,000.

In an effort to reverse the filling of the lake with sediment, the village annexed the lake bottom in the early 2000s so as to gain control of the lake bottom and allow proceeding with cleanup. They won this only after a court case, as some people objected to the cost of the cleanup.

References

Villages in Illinois
Chicago metropolitan area
Villages in McHenry County, Illinois
Populated places established in 1974